Les Monts du Roumois is a commune in the department of Eure, northern France. The municipality was established on 1 January 2017 by merger of the former communes of Berville-en-Roumois (the seat), Bosguérard-de-Marcouville and Houlbec-près-le-Gros-Theil.

See also 
Communes of the Eure department

References 

Communes of Eure